The following outline is provided as an overview of and topical guide to information technology:

Information technology (IT) – microelectronics based combination of computing and telecommunications technology to treat information, including in the acquisition, processing, storage and dissemination of vocal, pictorial, textual and numerical information. It is defined by the Information Technology Association of America (ITAA) as "the study, design, development, implementation, support or management of computer-based information systems, particularly toward software applications and computer hardware."

Different names
There are different names for this at different periods or through fields. Some of these names are:
 ICT – Information and communication technologies
 IT – Information technology
 DCT – Data Communication & technology
 CDT – Creative digital technology
 DT – Design & technology
 Communication technology

Underlying technology
MOSFET (MOS transistor)
Semiconductor device fabrication
PMOS (p-type MOS)
NMOS (n-type MOS)
CMOS (complementary MOS)
Floating-gate MOSFET (FGMOS)
Silicon-gate transistor (SGT)
Power MOSFET
Multi-gate field-effect transistor (MuGFET)
FinFET (fin field-effect transistor)
Thin-film transistor (TFT)
Integrated circuit (IC)
Hybrid integrated circuit (HIC)
Monolithic integrated circuit (IC) chip
Planar process
MOS integrated circuit (MOS IC)
Silicon-gate technology (SGT) MOS IC
Three-dimensional integrated circuit (3D IC)
Computer memory
Semiconductor memory
Random-access memory (RAM)
Static random-access memory (SRAM)
Dynamic random-access memory (DRAM)
Synchronous DRAM (SDRAM)
Nonvolatile memory (NVM)
Read-only memory (ROM)
Programmable ROM (PROM)
Floating-gate memory
EPROM (erasable PROM)
EEPROM (electrically erasable PROM)
Flash memory
Magnetic-core memory
Microprocessor
Central processing unit (CPU)
Graphics processing unit (GPU)
Digital signal processor (DSP)
Image signal processor (ISP)

History of information technology
 History of computing
 History of computing, by subject
 History of computing hardware
 History of computing hardware (1960s–present)
 History of computer hardware in Eastern Bloc countries
 History of artificial intelligence
 History of computer science
 History of operating systems
 History of programming languages
 History of software engineering
 History of the graphical user interface
 History of the Internet
 History of personal computers
 History of laptops
 History of video games
 History of the World Wide Web
 Timeline of computing 
 Timeline of computing hardware 2400 BC–1949
 Timeline of computing 1950–1979
 Timeline of computing 1980–1989
 Timeline of computing 1990–1999
 Timeline of computing 2000–2009

Information technology education and certification

IT degrees 
 BSIT or B.Sc IT – Bachelor of Science in Information Technology

 M.Sc. IT, MSc IT or MSIT – Master of Science in Information Technology
 BCA – Bachelor of Computer Applications
 MCA – Master of Computer Applications

Vendor-specific certifications
 Amazon Web Services has 5 certifications 
 Apple Inc. – sponsors the Apple certification program
 Avaya Professional Credential Program
 Cisco Systems – sponsors the Cisco Career Certifications program
 Citrix Systems – sponsors the Citrix Certified Administrator program
 Hewlett-Packard – sponsors the HP-CP certifications related to HP Technologies
 Dell – sponsors the Dell Certified Systems Expert program with Associate and Master levels
 Huawei – sponsors certifications
 IBM – sponsors certifications
 Juniper Networks – sponsors the Juniper Networks Technical Certification Program
 LANDesk – sponsors the Certified LANDesk Administrator and Certified LANDesk Engineer program
 Microsoft Corporation – sponsors the Microsoft Certified Professional program
 MySQL (as part of Oracle Corporation now) – sponsors a certification program
 NetApp – sponsors the NetApp Certification program
 Nortel – sponsors the Nortel Certifications program
 Novell – sponsors a certification program
 Object Management Group – sponsors the Certified Professional program for the Unified Modeling Language
 Oracle Corporation – sponsors the Oracle Certification Program
 Red Hat – sponsors the Red Hat Certification Program
 SAP – sponsors individual training and certifications
 SolarWinds – sponsors the SolarWinds Certified Professional Program for network management 
 Sun Microsystems – sponsors the Sun Certified Professional program
 Sybase – sponsors the Certified Sybase Professional program
 Ubuntu – provides Ubuntu Certified Professional program
 VMware – sponsors certification programs (VCP & VCDX)
 Zend Technologies – sponsors the Zend Certified Engineer program

Third-party and vendor-neutral certifications
Third-party commercial organizations and vendor neutral interest groups that sponsor certifications include:
XML Certification Program - XML Master
 Certiport – sponsors the Microsoft Office Specialist and IC3 certification (Internet and Computing Core).
 CompTIA (Computing Technology Industry Association) – offers 12 professional IT Certifications, validating foundation-level IT knowledge and skills.
 European Computer Driving License-Foundation – sponsors the European Computer Driving License (also called International Computer Driving License) (ICDL)
 International Information and Communication Technology Council Certification Program
 (ISC)² – sponsors the CISSP, SSCP and other security certifications
 Linux Professional Institute
 Majinate sponsors the Accredited Symbian Developer scheme for Symbian OS
 NACSE (National Association of Communication Systems Engineers) sponsors 36 Vendor Neutral, knowledge specific, Certifications covering the 5 major IT Disciplines which are: Data Networking, Telecomm, Web Design & Development, Programming & Business Skills for IT Professionals.
 The Open Group – sponsors TOGAF certification and the IT Architect Certification (ITAC)  and IT Specialist Certification (ITSC) skills and experience based IT certifications.
 Planet3 Wireless – sponsors the Certified Wireless Network Administrator (CWNA) certification
 SAGE (organization) – sponsors the cSAGE program
 SANS Institute – operates the Global Information Assurance Certification program

General certification
General certification of software practitioners has struggled. The ACM had a professional certification program in the early 1980s, which was discontinued due to lack of interest. Today, the IEEE is certifying software professionals, but only about 500 people have passed the exam .

 The IEEE Computer Society – sponsors the Certified Software Development Professional as well as membership designations, "Senior" and "Fellow" which reflect experience and peer review qualification.
 The IET – sponsors the Chartered Engineer and Incorporated Engineer, which can be ratified into the European Engineer
 The BCS – sponsors the Chartered IT Professional (CITP) programme.
 The Institute for Certification of Computing Professionals sponsors the Certified Computing Professional (CCP) and Associate Computing Professional (ACP) certifications
 The BDPA IT Institute – sponsors the BDPA IT Associate (BITA), the BDPA IT Professional (BITP), and the BDPA IT Master (BITM) certifications
 The Canadian Information Processing Society – sponsors the Information Systems Professional certification in Canada.
 The American Institute of Certified Public Accountants – sponsors the Certified Information Technology Professional program.
 APICS – establishes operations management standards and sponsors certification for Logistics

Information technology and society

Software Testing
 British Computer Society
 National Software Testing Laboratories
 American Society for Quality#Certifications
 ISTQB
 CSTE

Further reading
 Surveillance, Transparency and Democracy: Public Administration in the Information Age.  p. 35-57. University of Alabama Press, Tuscaloosa, AL.

References

External links

 /dictionary Information Technology Dictionary
 Information Technology Dictionary
 Information Technology Association of America
XML Certification Program - XML Master

information technology
information technology

Information technology